Helicon Photo Safe is a proprietary freeware and commercial digital image organization and protection tool produced by Helicon Soft Ltd. It is designed to be an image viewer and organizer which works together with the editing program Helicon Filter, as well as an image encryption tool. It is intended to be integrated into the future Helicon Filter 5.

Features
Helicon Photo Safe is compatible with both RAW formats and most standard formats, it can be used to access all photos on a computer, and images can be rated and tagged. In the commercial version, images may also be encrypted for protection.

Helicon Image Importer
The Helicon Image Importer is a tool which can import photos from various media. It can also perform automatic image renaming, grouping of images, batch keyword assignment, lossless jpeg rotation, and iptc editiong.

See also
 Helicon Filter
 Comparison of image viewers

References

Photo software
Image organizers
Windows graphics-related software
Windows-only freeware